Ankerite is a calcium, iron, magnesium, manganese carbonate mineral of the group of rhombohedral carbonates with the chemical formula . In composition it is closely related to dolomite, but differs from this in having magnesium replaced by varying amounts of iron(II) and manganese. It forms a series with dolomite and kutnohorite.

The crystallographic and physical characters resemble those of dolomite and siderite. The angle between the perfect rhombohedral cleavages is 73° 48', the hardness is 3.5 to 4, and the specific gravity is 2.9 to 3.1. The color is white, grey or reddish to yellowish brown.

Ankerite occurs with siderite in metamorphosed ironstones and sedimentary banded iron formations. It also occurs in carbonatites. In sediments it occurs as authigenic, diagenetic minerals and as a product of hydrothermal deposition. It is one of the minerals of the dolomite-siderite series, to which the terms brown-spar, pearl-spar and bitter-spar have been historically loosely applied.

It was first recognized as a distinct species by W. von Haidinger in 1825, and named for Matthias Joseph Anker (1771–1843) of Styria, an Austrian mineralogist.

It has been found in Western Tasmania, in mines in Dundas, Tasmania.

Image gallery

See also
List of minerals
List of minerals named after people

References

Mineral Galleries

External links

Calcium minerals
Magnesium minerals
Iron(II) minerals
Manganese(II) minerals
Carbonate minerals
Dolomite group
Trigonal minerals
Minerals in space group 148
Luminescent minerals